Michael Spellman (born 21 September 2002) is an English professional footballer who plays as a winger for Blyth Spartans on loan from Sunderland.

Club career
Spellman started his career with the Park View Academy. Having scored 19 goals in 23 appearances in all competitions, including 14 in 16 in the Wearside League for Chester-le-Street United, he went on trial with EFL Championship side in March 2022. He spent the second half of the 2021–22 season on a non-contract agreement with Sunderland, signing permanently in June 2022.

In September 2022, he joined Northern Premier League side Whitby Town on a one-month loan deal. After four games in all competitions, in which he scored once, he returned to Sunderland at the end of the loan spell.

Career statistics
.

References

2002 births
Living people
English people of Scottish descent
English footballers
Association football wingers
Northern Premier League players
Sunderland A.F.C. players
Whitby Town F.C. players